Altyn Tamgan Tarhan inscription or Ihe Ashete inscription is an inscription on a stele erected by Bilge Ishbara Tamgan Tarkhan, the son of Ashina Duoxifu. It was discovered 53 km north-west to the Orkhon inscriptions. According to András Róna-Tas it was erected in 724.

Discovery and translation
It was discovered by Russian scientist N. P. Levin in 1891.

Region
The inscription was found in northeast of Tulee mountain, Bulgan Province, Mongolia.

Complete text

References 

History of Mongolia
Archaeological sites in Mongolia
1891 archaeological discoveries
8th-century inscriptions
Göktürk inscriptions